Friesdorf is a village and a former municipality in the Mansfeld-Südharz district, Saxony-Anhalt, Germany. Since 6 March 2009, it has been part of the town Mansfeld.

People 
 Friedrich Wilhelm Leopold Pfeil (28 March 1783 – 4 September 1859),  German forester

Former municipalities in Saxony-Anhalt
Mansfeld